The Pokrovskyi Monastery Cathedral is  the oldest cathedral in Kharkiv, Ukraine, built in 1689. The complex includes the seminary, Pokrovskyi Cathedral, Kharkiv episcopal residence and the Temple of the Mother of God Ozerianska.

History 
The first wooden church was built in the first half of the XVII century and consecrated in the honour of Intercession of the Theotokos. In 1659 local Cossacks decided to construct a stone temple. It was finished by 1689 and consecrated by the bishop . The stone church was designed in a traditional Russian way — three-domed basilica placed on a warm ‘winter’ temple. The upper part was connected to the bell tower with a narthex gallery.

The monastery complex included a collegium, the first higher education establishment in Kharkov.

The Pokrovski church was restored in 1729 and equipped with new church ware. In 1732 the bell tower received a 1.6 tonn new bell. In 1799—1846 the church had a status of a cathedral. It was closed in the 1920s and decayed for more than 30 years. In 1992 it was returned under management of the Ukrainian Orthodox Church.

Gallery

References

Sources 

Cathedrals in Kharkiv
Eastern Orthodox cathedrals in Ukraine